Aldo Catani (born 10 June 1951) is a retired Luxembourgian football midfielder.

References

1951 births
Living people
Luxembourgian footballers
FC Avenir Beggen players
FC Etzella Ettelbruck players
Association football midfielders
Luxembourg international footballers